Alexander Petrovsky may refer

 Metropolitan Alexander, a metropolitan of Kiev, Ukrainian Exarchate
 Fictional character from Sex and the City played by Russian actor Mikhail Baryshnikov